The 2018 Western Athletic Conference baseball tournament will take place beginning on May 23 and ending on May 26 or 27. The top six regular season finishers of the league's ten teams will meet in the double-elimination tournament to be held at Hohokam Stadium, spring training home of the Oakland Athletics in Mesa, Arizona. The winner will earn the Western Athletic Conference's automatic bid to the 2018 NCAA Division I baseball tournament.

Seeding and format
The top six finishers from the regular season will be seeded based on conference winning percentage.

Bracket

References

Tournament
Western Athletic Conference Baseball Tournament
Western Athletic Conference baseball tournament